Land Clark (born March 1, 1962 in Santa Barbara, California) is an American football official  in the National Football League (NFL) since the 2018 NFL season, wearing uniform number 130.

Personal life
Clark resides in Albuquerque, New Mexico.

Outside of the NFL, Clark is the chief building official for the city of Albuquerque.

Officiating career

Early years
Clark served several seasons in the NFL Officiating Development program. Prior to entering the NFL, Clark officiated in the Pac-12 Conference and worked as a referee and deep wing official. He was the referee for the 2013 BCS National Championship Game.

NFL career
Clark was hired by the NFL in 2018 as a field judge, and was promoted to referee with the start of the 2020 NFL season following the retirement of Walt Anderson.

2022 Crew 

 R: Land Clark
 U: Paul King
 DJ: Tom Stephan
 LJ: Brian Bolinger
 FJ: Michael Banks
 SJ: Dominique Pender
 BJ: Greg Meyer
 RO: Randy Campbell
 RA: Desiree Abrams

References

1962 births
Living people
National Football League officials